Gros Basin is a rural village in the Corail commune of the Corail Arrondissement, in the Grand'Anse department of Haiti.

The village is surrounded by hilly terrain and is locally known for fishing.

See also 

 Haitian cuisine

References

Populated places in Grand'Anse (department)